Andrew Clark (born April 8, 1988) is a Canadian professional ice hockey player currently under contract with SC Langenthal of the Swiss League (SL).

Playing career 
He played for Acadia University in the Atlantic conference of Canadian Interuniversity Sport (CIS). For his outstanding play during the 2011–12 season, Clark was selected as the 2011-12 Canadian Interuniversity Sport player of the year, and was awarded the Senator Joseph A. Sullivan Trophy.

Andrew left the Acadia University Hockey program at the end of the 2012–13 AUS Hockey season and signed a professional contract with the Stockton Thunder, an ECHL affiliate of the Edmonton Oilers. He appeared in a total of 66 ECHL contests for the Thunder until the end of the 2013-14 season with 26 goals and 43 assists. During the 2013-14 season, he also spent time in the AHL after signing a professional tryout agreement with the Bridgeport Sound Tigers in December 2013. Clark saw the ice in 35 AHL games, producing seven goals as well as twelve assists.

He moved abroad upon the conclusion of the 2013–14 campaign, joining Esbjerg Energy. Clark would lead the Danish league in scoring (36 games: 25 goals, 50 assists plus 15 games with nine goals and 16 assists in post season play) and helped the Esbjerg squad reach the finals, where they lost.

After making noise in the Danish league, he was picked up by the SC Rapperswil-Jona Lakers of Switzerland's second-tier National League B (NLB) prior to the 2015–16 campaign. He saw the ice in 39 regular season contests for the Lakers, scoring 19 goals while assisting on 28 more. On the way to the NLB finals, Clark played in 17 playoff games, tallying four goals and ten assists. The Lakers eventually fell short to HC Ajoie in the NLB finals.

He continued his way through the European leagues, signing with HC Innsbruck of the Austrian Hockey League on June 17, 2016.

Career statistics

Awards and honours

References

External links

1988 births
Living people
Brandon Wheat Kings players
Bridgeport Sound Tigers players
Canadian ice hockey left wingers
Esbjerg Energy players
HC TWK Innsbruck players
Ice hockey people from Manitoba
SC Rapperswil-Jona Lakers players
Sportspeople from Brandon, Manitoba
Stockton Thunder players
Canadian expatriate ice hockey players in Austria
Canadian expatriate ice hockey players in Denmark
Canadian expatriate ice hockey players in Switzerland